The Juno Award for "Classical Album of the Year" has been awarded since 1994, as recognition each year for the best vocal classical music album in Canada.

Winners

Best Classical Album (Vocal or Choral Performance) (1994 - 2002)
1994 - Claudette Leblanc (soprano), Valerie Tryon (piano), Debussy Songs
1995 - Vocal Soloists/Choeur et Orchestre symphonique de Montreal, Charles Dutoit - Conductor, Berlioz: Les Troyens
1996 - Ben Heppner (tenor), The Toronto Symphony Orchestra, Andrew Davis - Conductor, Ben Heppner Sings Richard Strauss
1997 - Choeur et orchestre symphonique de Montréal, Charles Dutoit - Conductor, Berlioz: La Damnation de Faust
1998 - Michael Schade (tenor), Russell Braun (baritone), Canadian Opera Company Orchestra, Richard Bradshaw, Soirée française
1999 - Gerald Finley (baritone), Stephen Ralls (piano), Songs of Travel
2000 - Ben Heppner, German Romantic Opera
2001 - Karina Gauvin; Russell Braun; Les Violons du Roy, G. F. Handel: Apollo e Dafne & Silete Venti
2002 - Ben Heppner, Air Français

Classical Album of the Year: Vocal or Choral Performance (2003 - Present)
2003 - Les Violons du Roy, Mozart Requiem
2004 - Isabel Bayrakdarian, James Parker, Cello Ensemble, Azulão
2005 - Isabel Bayrakdarian, Tafelmusik Baroque Orchestra, Cleopatra
2006 - Isabel Bayrakdarian, Serouj Kradjian, Viardot-Garcia: Lieder Chansons Canzoni Mazurkas
2007 - Isabel Bayrakdarian, Russell Braun, Michael Schade, Mozart: Arie e Duetti
2008 - Measha Brueggergosman, Surprise
2009 - Ensemble Caprice, Gloria! Vivaldi’s Angels
2010 - Adrianne Pieczonka, Adrianne Pieczonka sings Puccini
2011 - Gerald Finley, Great Operatic Arias
2012 - Jane Archibald, Orchestre Symphonique Bienne, (Thomas Rösner, conductor), Haydn Arias
2013 - Karina Gauvin, Prima Donna
2014 - Marie-Nicole Lemieux & André Gagnon, Lettres de Madame Roy à sa fille Gabrielle
2015 - Gerald Finley & Julius Drake, Schubert: Winterreise
2016 - L'Harmonie des Saisons, Las Ciudades de Oro
2017 - Orchestre Symphonique de Montréal with Kent Nagano, L’Aiglon
2018 - Barbara Hannigan with Ludwig Orchestra, Crazy Girl Crazy
2019 - Barbara Hannigan with Reinbert de Leeuw, Vienna: Fin de siècle
2020 - Ottawa Bach Choir conducted by Lisette Canton, Handel: Dixit Dominus; Bach & Schutz: Motets
2021 - Toronto Mendelssohn Choir with Toronto Symphony Orchestra conducted by Sir Andrew Davis, Massenet: Thaïs, Erin Wall, Joshua Hopkins, Andrew Staples

References

Classical Album - Vocal or Choral
Classical music awards
Album awards